Hickory Corners is a census-designated place (CDP) in Barry Township in Barry County, Michigan, United States. The population was 313 at the 2020 census.

History
The first settler, the Rev. Moses Lawrence, built his home in 1834 on the shore of Lawrence Lake about a half mile east of the present town. In 1837, surveyors found a large hickory tree in the center of section 28, from which the settlement took its name. Solomon C. Hall built the first house in the town and became the first postmaster in July 1844.

Geography
Hickory Corners is located in southwestern Barry County at the intersection of Kellogg School Road and West Hickory Road.

Demographics

Sites of interest

The Gilmore Car Museum, a collection of classic automobiles, is located at the intersection of M-43 and West Hickory Road, with a Hickory Corners mailing address. The museum includes the Michigan Motor Sports Hall of Fame.

Media

On the CBS TV series The Neighborhood, the character Gemma is from Hickory Corners. Her husband, Dave, is from East Kalamazoo.

References

Census-designated places in Michigan
Unincorporated communities in Barry County, Michigan
Grand Rapids metropolitan area